José Cardoso Cassandra (born 17 February 1964 in Príncipe) is a São Toméan politician. He was President of the Regional Government of Príncipe from 2006 to 2020.

Cassandra is leader of the Union for Change and Progress in Príncipe (UMPP), a regionalist independent group supported by the ruling Force for Change Democratic Movement-Democratic Convergence Party (MDFM-PCD) coalition.

He was reelected in August 2010., 2014 and 2018.

References

Living people
1964 births
People from Príncipe
21st-century São Tomé and Príncipe politicians